Hořepník is a municipality and village in Pelhřimov District in the Vysočina Region of the Czech Republic. It has about 600 inhabitants.

Administrative parts
Villages of Březina, Mašovice and Vítovice are administrative parts of Hořepník.

References

Villages in Pelhřimov District